Glenea canidia is a species of beetle in the family Cerambycidae. It was described by James Thomson in 1865. It is known from Malaysia and India.

References

canidia
Beetles described in 1865